Roy V. Young is an American fantasy writer.  His novels are set in the comedy world of Leiblein, and spoof various common fantasy themes.  The hero is a certain Count Yor, and his associates Dword and Trebor.  Yor's inability to avoid rumour of his own exploits, especially the "Ballad of Count Yor" is a constant theme through the novels.

In the 1990s publisher TSR commissioned a number of standalone fantasy novels, some of which were humorous or light fantasy.  Young's first volume was endorsed by Roger Zelazny, and sold well enough to justify a second.  The collapse of TSR meant that no more were commissioned. A third novel exists in manuscript, provisionally titled "Year of the Thogs."

Bibliography

 Captains Outrageous.  TSR, 1994.
 Yor's Revenge.  TSR, 1995.

External links
 Review of Captains Outrageous

20th-century American novelists
American fantasy writers
American male novelists
Living people
20th-century American male writers
Year of birth missing (living people)